Verband Deutscher Prädikatsweingüter e.V. or the Association of German Prädikat Wine Estates, is an association of more than 200 wineries in Germany that promotes binding quality standards and – since 1990 – also ecological management of its members' wineries. Many of Germany's top wine producers are members. It is commonly known by its abbreviation VDP.

History
It was founded in 1910 as Verband Deutscher Naturweinversteigerer e.V., Association of German Natural (i.e. not chaptalized) Wine Auctioneers.
Founding members were the four regional associations

 Association of Natural Wine Auctioneers of the Rhine Palatinate, founded in 1908
 Rheingau Vineyard Owners Association, founded in 1897 in Rüdesheim on the Rhine
 Trier Association of Vineyard Owners of Mosel, Saar and Ruwer, founded probably in 1910
 Association of natural wine auctioneers in Rheinhessen, founded in 1910.

It consists of 11 regional associations, one for each region in the German wine classification system.

Classification
In order to be a VDP member, a wine estate must adhere to certain standards which are slightly more stringent than those set down in the German wine law. VDP members may (and almost always do) use the VDP logotype, a stylized eagle with a cluster of grapes, on their wine bottles. Also, the members have access to the new VDP-specific classifications Erste Lage and Grosses Gewächs for top dry wines that fulfill the requirements. VDP and its regional associations also arrange German wine auctions and various marketing events.

Especially in the Mosel region, where the regional VDP association is known as Grosser Ring, several well-renowned wine estates are instead members of Bernkasteler Ring, which arranges similar auctions and marketing events.

In July 2018, the members adopted a sparkling wine classification that, like the wine classification, defines quality according to origin and provides for aging on the lees as an additional quality criterion. Accordingly, the focus is on origin with the qualitatively increasing levels of VDP-Gutssekt, VDP-Ortssekt, VDP-Erste Lage and VDP-Große Lage. The technology of bottle fermentation is mandatory. Estate and local sparkling wines must lie on their lees for at least 15 months, site sparkling wines and all vintage sparkling wines for at least 36 months.

Member estates
():

Maps

See also
German wine label

References

External links
 VDP website

German wine
Organizations established in 1910
Wine industry organizations
!
1910 establishments in Germany
Wine classification
Appellations
Food product brands
Geographical indications
Organic food